This is a list of teams on the 2012–13 Ontario Curling Tour

Men
As of October 18, 2012

Women
As of September 22, 2012

External links
Men's Teams
Women's Teams

Ontario Curling Tour
2012 in Canadian curling
2013 in Canadian curling
Ontario sport-related lists
2012 in Ontario
2013 in Ontario
Ontario Curling Tour teams